Thinking of You is an album led by pianist Duke Jordan recorded in 1979 in Denmark (with one track from 1978) and released on the Danish SteepleChase label in 1982.

Reception

AllMusic awarded the album 4½ stars stating it "swings nicely in an underplayed fashion".

Track listing
All compositions by Duke Jordan
 "The Fuzz" - 4:46
 "Thinking of You" - 5:47
 "Anything Can Happen" - 6:32
 "The Peanut Bar" - 4:00
 "Foxie Cakes" - 5:27
 "Light Foot" - 5:41
 "My Queen Is Home to Stay" - 4:21
 "Deacon's Blues" - 5:11
 "Diamond Stud" - 5:03 Bonus track on CD reissue
 "It's Hard to Know" - 7:14 Bonus track on CD reissue

Personnel
Duke Jordan - piano 
Niels-Henning Ørsted Pedersen - bass (tracks 1-4 & 6-10)
Billy Hart - drums (tracks 1-4 & 6-10)

References

1982 albums
Duke Jordan albums
SteepleChase Records albums